List of Guggenheim Fellowships awarded in 1992

References

1992
1992 awards